Taeniogramma octolineata is a species of geometrid moth in the family Geometridae. It is found in North America.

The MONA or Hodges number for Taeniogramma octolineata is 6423.

References

Further reading

 

Ennominae
Articles created by Qbugbot
Moths described in 1887